Delias rosenbergii, Rosenberg's painted Jezebel, is a butterfly in the family Pieridae. It was described by Samuel Constantinus Snellen van Vollenhoven in 1865. It is found on the Wallace line. The name honours William Frederick Henry Rosenberg.

The wingspan is about 70–75 mm.

The larvae feed on Loranthus species.

Subspecies
D. r. rosenbergi (northern Sulawesi)
D. r. lorquini C. & R. Felder, [1865] (Menado)
D. r. chrysoleuca Mitis, 1893 (southern Sulawesi)
D. r. salayerana Rothschild, 1915 (Selajar)
D. r. munaensis Nakano, 1988 (Muna, Buton)

References

External links
Delias at Markku Savela's Lepidoptera and Some Other Life Forms

rosenbergii
Butterflies described in 1865
Taxa named by Samuel Constantinus Snellen van Vollenhoven